Bibliothèque Pascal is a 2010 Hungarian drama film directed by Szabolcs Hajdu. The film was selected as the Hungarian entry for the Best Foreign Language Film at the 83rd Academy Awards, but it didn't make the final shortlist.

Cast
 Orsolya Török-Illyés as Mona
 Andi Vasluianu as Viorel
 Shamgar Amram as Pascal
 Răzvan Vasilescu as Gigi Paparu
 Oana Pellea as Rodica Paparu
 Tibor Pálffy as Saxophone player
 Florin Piersic Jr. as Countryman
 Mihai Constantin as Gicu
 Orion Radies as Little boy
  as Police chief
 Mihai Călin as Police officer

See also
 List of submissions to the 83rd Academy Awards for Best Foreign Language Film
 List of Hungarian submissions for the Academy Award for Best Foreign Language Film

References

External links

2010 films
2010s Hungarian-language films
2010s Romanian-language films
2010 drama films
BDSM in films
Hungarian drama films
2010 multilingual films
Hungarian multilingual films
Films directed by Szabolcs Hajdu